Thayil is a name. Notable people with the name include:

Given name 
 Thayil John Cherian (1920–2006), Indian cardio-thoracic surgeon

Surname 
 Kim Thayil (born 1960), American guitarist for the band Soundgarden
 Jeet Thayil (born 1959), Indian poet